Bogdanovo (Boğźan) is a rural locality (a selo) and the administrative centre of Bogdanovsky Selsoviet, Miyakinsky District, Bashkortostan, Russia. The population was 474 as of 2010. There are 7 streets.

Geography 
Bogdanovo is located 23 km west of Kirgiz-Miyaki (the district's administrative centre) by road. Yenebey-Ursayevo is the nearest rural locality.

References 

Rural localities in Miyakinsky District